Steve Swaja is an American dragster designer in the 1960s.

Swaja was responsible for both Tony Nancy wedge cars of 1963, the Yellow Fang slingshot in 1963, and "TV Tommy" Ivo's Videoliner in 1965.

He designed Tony Nancy's first dragster, "The Silver Car", in 1963; it was built at Tommy Ivo & d Rod Pepmuller's shop, with the aluminum metal bending done by Bob Sorrell; the car won "Best Engineered" at its debut, the 1963 Winternationals.

Among Swaja's other projects were cars for Rocky Childs, Ewell-Stecker-Kamboor, Fred Fischback, Scrima-Milodon, Dusty Rhodes, and Eagle Electric; he also did Hot Rod's XR-6 roadster.

Swaja became good friends with Nancy.

Notes

Sources
Taylor, Thom.  "Beauty Beyond the Twilight Zone" in Hot Rod, April 2017, pp. 30–43.

American automobile designers
Drag racing
Living people
Year of birth missing (living people)